Menna van Praag is an English novelist and journalist.

Biography 
Menna van Praag was born in Cambridge and studied modern history at the University of Oxford. She worked as a waitress and struggled with being overweight. Her mother and teacher inspired her life. Her novella, a fable, Men, Money and Chocolate (2009) has been translated into 26 languages.

She currently lives in Cambridge with her partner, who runs a vegetarian cafe. During 2021/22 she is a Royal Literary Fund Fellow at Anglia Ruskin University.

References 

Alumni of the University of Oxford
English journalists
English women non-fiction writers
English women novelists
Living people
People from Cambridge
Year of birth missing (living people)